Anatoma flemingi is a species of minute sea snail, a marine gastropod mollusc or micromollusc in the family Anatomidae.

Distribution
This marine species occurs off New Zealand.

References

External links

 To World Register of Marine Species

Anatomidae
Gastropods described in 2002
Gastropods of New Zealand
Endemic fauna of New Zealand
Endemic molluscs of New Zealand